Constantin Gruiescu (born 24 June 1945) is a Romanian boxer. He competed at the 1972 Summer Olympics and the 1976 Summer Olympics.

References

External links
 

1945 births
Living people
Romanian male boxers
Olympic boxers of Romania
Boxers at the 1972 Summer Olympics
Boxers at the 1976 Summer Olympics
People from Mehedinți County
AIBA World Boxing Championships medalists
Flyweight boxers